Narasimha Purana is one of the Upapuranas. R.C. Hazra in his Studies in the Upapuranas came to the conclusion that the original text was written in the later part of the 5th century, though several portions of it were added much later. This work was translated into Telugu about 1300.

Content 
The recension presented by the printed editions of the text has 68 chapters. The chapters 36-54 consist the narratives of the ten Avatars of Vishnu. Chapter 21 and 22 contain the short genealogical lists of the kings of the Surya Vamsha (Solar dynasty) and the Soma Vamsha (Lunar dynasty), the former ending with Buddha, son of Shuddhoana and the latter with Kshemaka, grandson of Udayana. Chapters 57-61 of this work is also found as an independent work, the Harita Samhita or Laghuharita Smriti.

See also 
Markandeya
Narasimha
Puranas

References

Bibliography

External links 
Narasimha Purana text in Devanagari script

Puranas
Vaishnava texts